Khed may refer to several places and administrative divisions in India:

Khed, Ratnagiri, a town in Ratnagiri district, Maharashtra
Khed taluka, Ratnagiri, the administrative division
Khed (Lok Sabha constituency), a former constituency
Khed, Satara, a census town in Satara district, Maharashtra
Rajgurunagar (Khed), a census town in Pune district, Maharashtra
Khed taluka, the administrative division
Khed Shivapur, a village in Pune district, Maharashtra
Khed, Rajasthan, a village in Barmer district, Rajasthan

See also
 Khergarh (disambiguation)